Dan Hawkins (born 1960) is an American football coach and former player and sportscaster.

Dan, Danny or Daniel Hawkins may also refer to:

 Dan Hawkins (footballer), Welsh footballer for Salford City
 Dan Hawkins (musician) (born 1976), English rock guitarist
 Daniel Hawkins (politician) (born 1960), American politician in the Kansas House of Representatives
 Daniel Hawkins (rugby union) (born 1991), New Zealand rugby union player
D. L. Hawkins (Daniel Hawkins), a character in the TV series Heroes
Danny Hawkins, character in the 1948 American film Moonrise